Walter Brown "Wattie" Reside (6 October 1905 – 3 May 1985) was a New Zealand rugby union player. A loose forward, Reside represented Wairarapa at a provincial level, and was a member of the New Zealand national side, the All Blacks, on their 1929 tour of Australia. He played six matches for the All Blacks on that tour, including one international. Of Ngāti Kahungunu descent, Reside also represented New Zealand Māori.

References

1905 births
1985 deaths
Rugby union players from Masterton
Ngāti Kahungunu people
New Zealand rugby union players
New Zealand international rugby union players
Wairarapa rugby union players
Māori All Blacks players
Rugby union flankers